Rosseau Aerodrome  is located adjacent to Rosseau, Ontario, Canada.

See also
 Windermere Airport
 Lake Rosseau/Arthurlie Bay Water Aerodrome
 Lake Rosseau/Morgan Bay Water Aerodrome
 Lake Rosseau/Windermere Water Aerodrome

References

Registered aerodromes in Ontario